GENICOM was an American manufacturer of computer printers, based in Chantilly, Virginia. The company operated from 1982 to 2003.

The GE years
In 1954, General Electric (GE) decided to decentralize the company into separate business units. After reorganizing the motors and controls groups, several products remained that did not fit into the new groups- these 'leftovers' were formed into the Specialty Control Department.

A decision was made to build a new plant in Waynesboro, Virginia for Specialty Control with Dr. Louis T. Rader as General Manager.  $3.5 million was used to purchase  and  build the plant on the site of the original 1927 Waynesboro airport.  The seminal managers and engineers consisted of 145 families moved from Schenectady, New York and the initial workforce consisted of about 400 local residents were hired in the first year.

The General Electric Specialty Control Plant was added to the National Register of Historic Places in 2012.

In 1982, GE sold the printer and relays groups and the company was formed as the GENICOM Corporation in 1983. The 1987 purchase of the printer business assets of Centronics added the 350 series dot matrix printers and the LineWriter series of band printers to their product line.

During these years, Genicom leased offices in Calabasas, California. At this facility, development was being conducted on a 400 dot-per-inch monochrome laser printer. In the early 1990s, GENICOM's headquarters and corporate offices were moved from Waynesboro, VA to Chantilly, Virginia.

In January 1995, the purchase of Printer System Corporation (PSC), a small developer of IBM interfaces in Gaithersburg, Maryland, was announced.  PSC President Art Gallo joined GENICOM as a vice president.  PSC became GENICOM's laser development group, and began producing GENICOM printers using Lexmark and Kentek engines.

In 1996, the Texas Instruments printer business was purchased, giving GENICOM a line of airline-ticket, boarding-pass and baggage-tag printers.

In August 1997, GENICOM purchased the printer division of Digital Equipment Corporation for $27 million, and produced printers under both the GENICOM and Digital logos.  Compaq purchased Digital in February 1998, and new products were then branded with the Compaq logo.  The relays group was sold to CII Technologies (since acquired by Tyco International) and soon moved to North Carolina.

In 1997, a new  repair facility was built in Louisville, Kentucky and operations were moved from Waynesboro. The Louisville operation proved unprofitable and was closed in April 2000.

GENICOM upgraded their old ASK/CA Manman database to Oracle; the project was budgeted for $6 million but cost $20 million by 1999.

Delisting
GENICOM's stock was delisted from the NASDAQ in January when stock price went below $1.  CEO Paul Winn and Chief Financial Officer James Gale were relieved of their positions in March as the company went into chapter 11 and Shaun Donnellan was brought in as CEO.  The Canadian operations were sold for $6.22 million and the airline printer business was sold to IER for $3.5 million.  The ongoing lawsuit with Compaq was settled for $12.6 million.  GENICOM International was spun off as a separate corporation, selling and marketing GENICOM products.

In August, Sun Capital Partners and Art Gallo purchased the remaining assets of GENICOM, including the operations in Chantilly, Waynesboro and McAllen.

The Datacom manufacturing operation was purchased in 2001 and operated as a sister company.

TallyGenicom
In 2003, GENICOM and Tally merged to form TallyGenicom (TG).

References

 Louis T Rader papers at VCU

American companies established in 1982
American companies disestablished in 2003
Computer companies established in 1982
Computer companies disestablished in 2003
Computer printer companies
Defunct computer companies of the United States
Defunct manufacturing companies based in Virginia